John Trent (1935, London - June 3, 1983, Snelgrove, Ontario, Canada) was a British-born Canadian film director.  He directed such films as Homer, Middle Age Crazy, and It Seemed Like a Good Idea at the Time.

Before working in feature films, Trent worked in Canadian television in the 1960s, directing episodes of such popular CBC series as Quentin Durgens, M.P. and Wojeck, based on the career of the controversial Dr. Morton Shulman, then Toronto’s chief coroner.  In addition to producing his own films, his company Quadrant Films also produced such fare as Bob Clark's vampire horror film Deathdream.

Trent died in a road accident while returning from delivering his son, who was the Ontario Under 16 show-jumping champion, to an event.  He was killed by a police car which came around a bend on the wrong side, and hit his compact Cadillac head-on.

Selected filmography

References 

Film directors from Ontario
Canadian people of English descent
Film producers from Ontario
1935 births
1983 deaths
Road incident deaths in Canada
Canadian television directors